Vaire is a commune in the Doubs department of eastern France. The municipality was established on 1 June 2016 and consists of the former communes of Vaire-Arcier (the seat) and Vaire-le-Petit.

See also 
Communes of the Doubs department

References 

Communes of Doubs